Serpentine, a fantasy novella by Philip Pullman, is set after His Dark Materials and before the second book of The Book of Dust series. The manuscript was originally sold at a charity auction in 2004 and the book was publicly released in October 2020.

Origins
Serpentine was not originally intended for publication but was instead written in 2004 at the special request of Nicholas Hytner (then the artistic director at the Royal National Theatre) to be auctioned for charity during the company's production of His Dark Materials; the work sold for a "substantial sum". At the time of writing Pullman had not intended to revisit Lyra as an adult but after the publication of The Secret Commonwealth decided to issue the novella as it prefigures Lyra and Pantalaimon's character development in The Book of Dust.

Synopsis
In this story, a teenage Lyra and her dæmon Pantalaimon revisit Trollesund, the Arctic town prominently featured in Northern Lights as the place of her first meeting with the aeronaut Lee Scoresby and the armoured bear Iorek Byrnison. They seek the witch-consul Dr. Lanselius in the hope of finding answers to their ability to separate.

Audiobook
An audiobook narrated by Olivia Colman will be released on the same day as the print and ebook versions.

References

2020 short stories
Short stories by Philip Pullman
His Dark Materials books
Fantasy short stories
2020 children's books